Amadeus IX (1 February 1435 – 30 March 1472), nicknamed the Happy, was the Duke of Savoy from 1465 to 1472. The Catholic Church venerates him with a liturgical feast on March 30.

Life
He was born at Thonon-les-Bains, the son of Louis, Duke of Savoy, and Anne de Lusignan, daughter of Janus of Cyprus, King of Cyprus. In 1452, his mother arranged a political marriage to Yolande of Valois (1434–1478), sister of Louis XI of France and daughter of Charles VII of France. Because of his epilepsy and retirement, she was left in control of the state.

France and the Holy Roman Empire competed to gain control of Savoy's strategically important Alpine's mountain passes and trade routes. His sister, Charlotte of Savoy, became the second wife of Louis XI of France. French influence increased in Savoy and involved the country in the wars between France and the emperors. The Castle of Moncalleri in Piedmont, Italy was initially built around 1100 as a fortress on a hill, to command the main southern access to Turin. In the mid-15th century Yolande turned it into a Renaissance Royal Palace.

Amadeus was a particular protector of Franciscan friars and endowed other religious houses as well as homes for the care of the poor and suffering. He made a pilgrimage to Saint-Claude in 1471. Amadeus died in 1472.

He was also an avid collector of manuscripts, adding over sixty items to the ducal library started by his great-grandfather Amadeus VIII.

Family
Amadeus IX had ten children with Yolande of Valois:
 Louis (1453)
 Anne (1455–1480), married Frederick IV of Naples (1452–1504), prince of Altamura
 Charles (1456–1471), Prince of Piedmont
 Maria (1460–1511) married Philip of Hachberg-Sausenberg (1454–1503)
 Louise (1461–1503), married Hugh, Prince of Chalon and, later, became a Poor Clare nun 
 Philibert (1465–1482), oldest surviving son
 Bernard (1467)
 Charles (1468–1490)
 James Louis (1470–1485), Count of Genevois, France
 Gian Claudio Galeazzo (1472)

His daughter Louise became a nun of the Franciscan Second Order after being widowed at a young age. She was also beatified.

Beatification
A painting of Amadeus, made in 1474 was housed in the Dominican church in Turin and acquired a miraculous reputation.
In 1612 a brief text was published in the same city, by Girolamo Cordieri, canon of the cathedral chapter of Mondovi, extolling the holy Amadeus. Cordieri was later appointed theologian to Charles Emmanuel I, Duke of Savoy. Also that year, a canon from Vercelli published a compendium of miracles attributed to the intercession of Amadeus IX. The cultus of Amadeus was actively promoted by Charles Emanuel's son, Prince Maurice of Savoy, Cardinal of Vercelli.

In 1613, an Historia del Beato Amedeo terzo duca di Savoia was composed by Fr. Pietro-Francisco Malletta. Six years later, the Duke of Savoy issued nine-florin coins depicting Amadeus IX on one side. These appear to have been used as religious medals, particularly in the Chablais, where they were distributed by Francis de Sales.

Michel Merle suggests that the revival of the cult of Amadeus IX was part of a decades long effort on the part of the House of Savoy to enhance its political status. Presented as a holy prince known for his charity and concern for the poor, Amadeus IX was beatified on 3 March 1677 by Pope Innocent XI.

Ancestry

References

1435 births
1472 deaths
15th-century Dukes of Savoy
15th-century venerated Christians
Burials at Vercelli Cathedral
French beatified people
Roman Catholic royal saints
Italian people of Cypriot descent
People from Thonon-les-Bains
People with epilepsy
Royalty and nobility with disabilities